Rashid Al Shamrani is a Saudi Arabian television actor, clinical psychologist and dramatist Writer, known for his role in the Saudi series "Bayny wa bynak" 1 and 2 and 3, Began his artistic career when he was student at the age 17.

Acting Works

Plays 
Tahat Al-Karsi

Series
Tash ma Tash
Awdat Asoid
Bayny wa bynak (for 3  seasons)
 Kalaf Al-Kalaf
 Sali Al-Moder
 Katwat Ala Al-Jbal

Movies
 Sabah Al-Laial .

References

Living people
Saudi Arabian male film actors
Saudi Arabian male stage actors
Saudi Arabian male television actors
Saudi Arabian writers
Saudi Arabian psychologists
People from Unaizah
1960 births